The , also written yukou, is a Japanese citrus found in the Nagasaki Prefecture and Saga Prefecture of Japan. Genetic analysis has shown it to be a cross between the kishumikan and koji, a part-tachibana orange hybrid native to Japan.

See also 
Citrus × depressa (Shikwasa, Hirami lemon)
 Jabara

References

External links 
The Yuko, a Native Japanese Citrus

Chinese fruit
Citrus hybrids
Garden plants of Asia
Japanese fruit
Ornamental trees